The Oakland Housing Authority (OHA) is the public housing agency for the city of Oakland, California.

Its mission statement states that it will "assure the availability of quality housing for low-income persons and promote the civic involvement and economic self-sufficiency of residents and further the expansion of affordable housing within Oakland."

The Oakland Housing Authority's largest department, the Leased Housing Department, is responsible for administering the Housing Choice Voucher program, otherwise known as the Section 8 program. The Authority periodically opens up its waiting list for new applicants, as the list is normally closed.

History
The Oakland Housing Authority was created in 1938. The first housing project of the Oakland Housing Authority was Campbell Village at Eighth and Campbell in West Oakland.  It was funded by the Housing Act of 1937, which required condemnation and demolition of the exact same number of housing units that would be constructed.

References
The Second Gold Rush: Oakland and the East Bay in World War II, Marilynn S. Johnson. University of California Press, 1993. pp. 105–106

External links
Oakland Housing Authority website

 
Housing Authority
Organizations based in Oakland, California
Politics of Oakland, California
Welfare in California